Streptomyces michiganensis is a bacterium species from the genus of Streptomyces which has been isolated from soil in the United States. Streptomyces michiganensis produces actinomycin X, antipain and mitomycin.

Further reading

See also 
 List of Streptomyces species

References

External links
Type strain of Streptomyces michiganensis at BacDive -  the Bacterial Diversity Metadatabase	

michiganensis
Bacteria described in 1957